David Spence (September 5, 1824 – September 16, 1885) was a political figure in Manitoba. He represented Poplar Point from 1870 to 1874 in the Legislative Assembly of Manitoba.

He was born in the Red River Colony, the son of James Spence and Jane Morwick, who was grandmother to John Norquay. In 1844, Spence married Catherine Hallett. He represented the parish of St. Anne's at the Convention of Forty, a parliament organized by Louis Riel in 1870. Spence also served as justice of the peace. He was accidentally shot in his home by a neighbour, who thought his gun was not loaded, and later died from his wound.

References 

1824 births
1885 deaths
Members of the Legislative Assembly of Manitoba
Firearm accident victims
Deaths by firearm in Manitoba
Accidental deaths in Manitoba
Canadian Métis people
Métis politicians